Alireza Karimi Machiani (born 21 March 1994) is an Iranian freestyle wrestler. He won a bronze medal at the 2015 World Championships in the 86 kg division. He was eliminated by J'den Cox of the United States in the third bout at the 2016 Olympics.

In February 2018 the United World Wrestling banned Karimi for six months for deliberately throwing a match to avoid having to face an Israeli opponent, Uri Kalashnikov who went on to win the bronze medal. He thereby violated International Wrestling Rules and the UWW Disciplinary Regulations, by intentionally losing to a Russian competitor in the quarterfinal of the U-23 World Championship in Bydgoszcz, Poland, in the 86-kilogram category, in November 2017. Karimi was then supposed to face the Israeli, Kalashnikov, in the repechage (to compete for the bronze medal), but he forfeited that match. Karimi’s coach, Hamidreza Jamshidi, was also banned from the sport, in his case for two years, for instructing Karimi to lose, shouting from the sidelines: "Ali Reza, lose." Karimi told the Iranian Students News Agency that he purposefully lost to avoid the risk of competing against the Israeli. Iran's wrestling federation had praised Karimi for throwing the match.

Israeli Prime Minister Benjamin Netanyahu criticized the Iranian regime for its actions, and accused it of interfering in sports and pressuring its athletes to not compete against the Israelis, saying "hating others will never make you a champion. It only makes you a pathetic and insecure loser." Iran Wrestling Federation president Rasoul Khadem said: "The federation will protest the verdict ... During his six-month ban, Karimi Mashiani can take part in domestic competitions and in the final stage of the national team selection. His ban will be over before the 2018 Jakarta Asian Games and the World Championship."

See also

Boycotts of Israel in individual sports

References

External links
 

Living people
Iranian male sport wrestlers
People from Karaj
1994 births
World Wrestling Championships medalists
Wrestlers at the 2016 Summer Olympics
Wrestlers at the 2018 Asian Games
Medalists at the 2018 Asian Games
Asian Games medalists in wrestling
Asian Games gold medalists for Iran
Olympic wrestlers of Iran
Asian Wrestling Championships medalists
21st-century Iranian people
Islamic Solidarity Games competitors for Iran